Liquid-liquid phase separation (LLPS) is well defined in the Biomolecular condensate page.

LLPS databases cover different aspects of LLPS phenomena, ranging from cellular location of the Membraneless Organelles (MLOs) to the role of a particular protein/region forming the condensate state. These databases contain manually curated data supported by experimental evidence in the literature and can include related features as presence of protein disorder, low complexity, post-translational modifications, experimental details, phase diagrams, among others.

See also 
Biomolecular condensate

MobiDB database

Intrinsically disordered proteins

DisProt database

References 

Protein structure
Structural bioinformatics software
Proteomics
Neurodegenerative disorders